Yunhe County is a county in the southwest of Zhejiang province, China. It is under the administration of the Lishui city.

History
Yunhe hosted the Provincial government of Zhejiang from the summer of 1942 till Japan's surrender in 1945 as part of the chain effect of the Pacific War situation. To retaliate the Attack on Pearl Harbor, the US navy launched the Doolittle Raid against Japan's homeland on April 18, 1942. Sixteen bombers took off from the carrier Hornet 700 miles away from Tokyo, and planned to fly to Chuchow airfield (now spelled as Quzhou, about 110 miles from Yunhe) in the Zhejiang Province after the raid. The raid was of little military consequence, but boosted American morale and showed that Japan was more open to air attack than had been supposed. Both as a revenge for the raid and to capture the local airfields to prevent another, the following month the Japanese launched a 100,000-strong offensive into the Chekiang and Kiangsi (now spelled as Zhejiang and Jiangxi) provinces where they also employed biological warfare, slaughtering no fewer than 250,000 Chinese before the Japanese withdrew in September. It was at the onset of the Zhejiang-Jiangxi Campaign that the Provincial government made a further retreat southwest, finally settling in Yunhe for the rest of the war.

Administrative divisions
Subdistricts:
Fuyun Subdistrict (浮云街道), Yuanhe Subdistrict (元和街道), Bailongshan Subdistrict (白龙山街道), Fenghuangshan Subdistrict (凤凰山街道)

Towns:
Chongtou (崇头镇), Shitang (石塘镇), Jinshuitan (紧水滩镇)

Townships:
Chishi Township (赤石乡), Wuxi She Ethnic Township (雾溪畲族乡), Anxi She Ethnic Township (安溪畲族乡)

Climate

Notes

County-level divisions of Zhejiang
Lishui